MinaCelentano – The Complete Recordings is a compilation album by Italian singers Mina and Adriano Celentano, released on 26 November 2021 by PDU, Clan Celentano and Sony Music.

Track listing

Charts

References

External links
 

2021 compilation albums
Mina (Italian singer) compilation albums
Adriano Celentano albums
Sony Music compilation albums